Anacleto Rapping (November 26, 1954 – September 17, 2017) was an American photographer and pedagogue.

Education
Anacleto Rapping studied journalism at San Jose State University (class of 1978).

Career
As a staff photographer at the Los Angeles Times for over two decades, Rapping covered presidential campaigns, Olympic Games, World Cup Soccer tournaments and the Academy Awards. He has also served as an instructor at Brooks Institute of Photography, where he stressed the importance of foreign travel. Rapping also helped launch three new feature sections at the Los Angeles Times—Sunday Calendar, Home, and Outdoors.

Rapping previously worked for the Hartford Courant in Connecticut and the Thousand Oaks News Chronicle in California. He has taken assignments in South Africa, Australia, Papua New Guinea, Indonesia, Singapore, Guatemala, Mexico, Canada and throughout the United States. He has photographed four summer Olympic Games, one winter Olympics and three World Cup Soccer tournaments.

Rapping is also known for his portrait photography. Over the decades, subjects have included Don Cheadle, Keith Richards, David Woodard, Bjork, Dennis Hopper, Bill Clinton, Pat Boone, Arnold Schwarzenegger and Ben Affleck.

Awards
Rapping has the distinct honor of sharing three Pulitzer Prizes for team coverage in news. Individually he received a Pulitzer nomination for his photography at the 1996 Summer Olympics in Atlanta. In 1986 he was awarded 2nd prize in the World Press Photo contest, and in 1996 he received three POYI awards.

Death
On September 17, 2017, at the age of 62, Rapping died after a 3-year battle with cancer.

References

1955 births
2017 deaths
Pulitzer Prize winners
Photographers from California
20th-century American photographers
American portrait photographers
San Jose State University alumni
Brooks Institute faculty